Lieutenant-General Sir Colin Muir Barber  & Bar (27 June 1897 – 5 May 1964) was a senior British Army officer who fought in both World War I and World War II where he commanded the 15th (Scottish) Infantry Division during their actions across Northwest Europe, from August 1944 until Victory in Europe Day in May 1945. Barber was reputed to be the tallest officer in the British Army (at ), and thus earned the ironic nickname "Tiny".

Early life and military career
Born in Birkenhead, Cheshire on 27 June 1897, the son of John Barber, Colin Barber was educated at Uppingham School. During World War I and served with the British Army's Liverpool Scottish in France and Belgium. On 29 March 1918, he was commissioned as a second lieutenant into the Queen's Own Cameron Highlanders, continuing to serve in France and Belgium with the 1st Battalion until the end of the war.

Between the wars
Barber continued to serve in the army during the interwar period 1919–1939, serving in India. He was promoted to captain on 31 January 1925 and mentioned in dispatches on 13 March for service in Waziristan. He then attended the Staff College, Quetta from 1929 to 1930, where he graduated with distinction. On his return to Britain, he had several staff appointments, mainly within the British Army's Scottish Command. In 1936, after a brief posting to Palestine during the early stages of the Arab revolt, he was promoted to major on 11 March 1937 and appointed to the General Staff as a General Staff Officer Grade 2 (GSO2).

Second World War
In 1940, during the Second World War, he was with the 51st (Highland) Infantry Division of the British Expeditionary Force (BEF) in France, where he commanded the 4th Battalion, Cameron Highlanders, and was awarded the Distinguished Service Order (DSO) and mentioned in dispatches.

From March 1941 Barber returned to the General Staff as a GSO1, until taking command, in October, of the 46th (Highland) Infantry Brigade, leading it through the Battle of Normandy in the summer of 1944. From 3 August 1944 Barber, when he was promoted to acting major-general, he commanded the 15th (Scottish) Infantry Division for the remainder of the campaign in north-west Europe until the end of World War II in Europe in May 1945. In this campaign, the 15th Division had the distinction to lead the three great river crossings of the Seine, the Rhine and the Elbe and Barber was awarded the bar to his DSO.

On 13 November 1945, while acting as representative for the Commander-in-Chief British Army of the Rhine, Barber and the Soviet major-general Nikolay Grigoryevich Lyashchenko signed the Barber Lyashchenko Agreement (also Gadebusch Agreement) in Gadebusch, redeploying some municipalities along the northern border between the Soviet and British zone of Allied-occupied Germany. Thus some eastern suburbs of Ratzeburg, such as Ziethen in Lauenburg, Mechow, Bäk and Römnitz became part of the Duchy of Lauenburg District (British zone), while the Lauenburgian municipalities of Dechow, Groß and Klein Thurow (now component parts of Roggendorf) as well as Lassahn (now a component part of Zarrentin am Schaalsee) were ceded to the adjacent Mecklenburgian district (Soviet zone). The redeployment was accomplished on 26 November, the respective occupational forces had to withdraw until 28 November to their new zonal territory. The British occupational forces provided all the inhabitants of villages to be ceded to the Soviet zone to be evacuated, if they wished so, including all their chattels by vehicles provided by the British forces. All displaced people (usually formerly forced labourers under the prior Nazi rule) in these villages and other eventual foreigners – except of Soviet citizens among them – were obligatorily to be relocated, while Soviet displaced people would have to stay.

Postwar

After the war, Barber commanded Highland District between 1946 and 1949 when he became Director of Infantry & Military Training, War Office. Barber was promoted to lieutenant-general on 27 February 1952 and made General Officer Commanding-in-Chief (GOC-in-C) of Scottish Command and Governor of Edinburgh Castle. He retired from the army on 28 March 1955.

Lieutenant-General Sir Colin Barber died on 5 May 1964. A memorial service was held at Canongate Kirk (The Kirk of Holyroodhouse) on 22 May 1964. There is a memorial plaque for Lieutenant-General Barber, as a commander in the 15th Scottish Infantry Division that liberated Tourville in June 1944.

He was married twice, first, in 1929, to Mary Edith Nixon. The couple had a son and a daughter; Mary died in 1949. His second wife was Mrs Anthony Milburn.

References

Bibliography

External links
British Army Officers 1939–1945
Generals of World War II

|-

|-

1897 births
1964 deaths
British Army lieutenant generals
British Army generals of World War II
British Army personnel of World War I
British military personnel of the 1936–1939 Arab revolt in Palestine
Companions of the Distinguished Service Order
Companions of the Order of the Bath
Commanders of the Order of the Crown (Belgium)
Deputy Lieutenants of Yorkshire
Graduates of the Staff College, Quetta
Liverpool Scottish soldiers
Knights Commander of the Order of the British Empire
People educated at Uppingham School
People from Birkenhead
Recipients of the Croix de guerre (Belgium)
Military personnel from Merseyside